Gracixalus quangi is a species of shrub frogs endemic to Vietnam.

References

quangi
Amphibians of Vietnam
Endemic fauna of Vietnam
Amphibians described in 2011
Taxa named by Jodi Rowley